Harold Payne Hardman (4 April 1882 – 9 June 1965) was an English football player and chairman.

Football career
Born in Kirkmanshulme, Manchester, Hardman was discovered by Blackpool as a schoolboy and thrown into the first team during their season in exile from the Football League in 1899–1900. He made his League debut on 8 September 1900, in a home draw against Gainsborough Trinity, the first competitive game played at Blackpool's Bloomfield Road ground. He became almost an ever-present for the club over the next three years.

An outside-left, Hardman had the ability to switch flanks and sometimes played on the right wing. He possessed speed and a knack for trickery, and although not a regular goalscorer himself, he provided the final pass for many of the goals scored by Bob Birkett and Jack Parkinson. Blackpool, however, as a whole, were a team struggling in the Second Division, and they found it too difficult to hold on to him.

In 1903, he signed for Everton for a fee of £100. He played for the Toffees in the 1906 and 1907 FA Cup Finals before joining Manchester United in 1908. Hardman later played for Bradford City, during their first two seasons in Division One, and Stoke City.

International career
Hardman made four appearances for the full England team, all while with Everton, between 1905 and 1908, scoring once in a 1–0 win over Ireland on 16 February 1907. He also earned 7 caps for England amateurs, netting three goals, including two in an 8–1 win over the Netherlands.

He was also a member of the gold medal-winning British team at the 1908 Summer Olympics, starting in all three games including the final where they beat Denmark 2–0.

Later years and death
After his playing days ended, he became a well-known administrator and, later, director of Manchester United. He became chairman of the club in 1951 after the death of James W. Gibson, and was at the helm at the time of the Munich air disaster on 6 February 1958, which claimed the lives of 23 people, including eight players, three non-playing staff, and ended the careers of two other players due to injury. He oversaw United's three league title glories of the 1950s as well as their early foray into the European Cup from 1956 to 1958. Hardman also saw Manchester United win the FA Cup in 1963 and another league championship in 1964–65, before his death in June 1965 at the age of 83. He was succeeded as chairman by Louis Edwards.

Outside football
In 1908, Hardman became a solicitor in Manchester.

Career statistics

Club
Source:

International
Source:

References

External links
 
 
 
 
 England player profile
 Everton profile
 Manchester United profile

1882 births
1965 deaths
People from Newton Heath
English footballers
England amateur international footballers
Blackpool F.C. players
Everton F.C. players
Manchester United F.C. players
Bradford City A.F.C. players
Stoke City F.C. players
English Football League players
Footballers at the 1908 Summer Olympics
Olympic footballers of Great Britain
English Olympic medallists
Olympic gold medallists for Great Britain
England international footballers
Manchester United F.C. directors and chairmen
Olympic medalists in football
English Football League representative players
Medalists at the 1908 Summer Olympics
Association football outside forwards
FA Cup Final players